Gârnic (German and Hungarian: Weitzenried) is a commune in Caraș-Severin County, western Romania with a population of 1,533 people. It is composed of two villages, Gârnic and Padina Matei (Mátévölgye).

 From 1911 to 1918 Szörénybúzás.

References

Communes in Caraș-Severin County
Localities in Romanian Banat
Czech communities in Romania
Place names of Slavic origin in Romania